ABC Television in Western Australia comprises national and local programming on the ABC television network in the Australian state of Western Australia, on a number of channels under the ABC call sign. There is some local programming from the Perth studio.

ABW was the historic name of the Australian Broadcasting Corporation's television station in Perth, with the "W" standing for the name of the state.

History
The station began broadcasting on 7 May 1960 from studios on Adelaide Terrace in downtown Perth and its transmitter at Bickley. The station was relayed throughout the state by a number of transmitters, and in the 2000s on the Optus Aurora free-to-view satellite television platform, replaced by Viewer Access Satellite Television (VAST) in 2010.

ABW commenced digital television transmission in January 2001, broadcasting on VHF Channel 12 while maintaining analogue television transmission on VHF Channel 2.

In 2005 the station moved to a new digital broadcast centre in East Perth.

In February 2013 ABC Perth was the first TV station in Western Australia to start producing a national news bulletin at 5.30pm. 

The analogue signal for ABW was shut off on 16 April 2013.

The Western Australian edition of 7.30 was presented by Andrew O'Connor each Friday night but was cancelled in 2014 to broadcast a national edition only, in a round of severe cuts to the ABC.

The channel used to carry live coverage of West Australian Football League matches every Saturday afternoon throughout the season until 2014.

ABC Television in WA today
 there is a large number of transmitters broadcasting a number of ABC channels.

Programming

ABC News Western Australia is presented by Pamela Medlen Monday-Thursday, Charlotte Hamlyn Friday-Sunday, and Tyne Logan for weather on weeknights. Tom Wildie presents local sport bulletins on weekends. The weeknight bulletins also incorporates a national finance segment presented by Alan Kohler in Melbourne.

Due to different time zones in Australia, the 5:30 news bulletin goes live to air on the east coast at 5.30pm and a separate local edition is produced for the west coast. Perth also receives a local version of ABC News at Noon produced from the ABC's Sydney studios, which is also simulcast live nationally on the ABC News channel.

Presenters
On 6 April 2018, weeknight weather presenter Rebecca Dollery stepped down from the ABC due to family reasons. From 9 April, Dollery was replaced by Irena Ceranic as weather presenter. In January 2021, Tyne Logan took over from Ceranic as weather presenter on weeknights.

In late June 2018  Tom Wildie replaced Trevor Jenkins as the weekend sport presenter.

James McHale formerly presented the news on weekdays, until 11 September 2020.

Briana Shepherd formerly presented the news on weekends, between August 2021 and June 2022, while Charlotte Hamlyn is on maternity leave.

Relay stations
The following stations relayed ABW throughout Western Australia:

See also
Television broadcasting in Australia
720 ABC Perth – radio station located in the same building

References

Television stations in Perth, Western Australia
Television channels and stations established in 1960
Australian Broadcasting Corporation television stations